Drunella cornutella is a species of spiny crawler mayfly in the family Ephemerellidae. It is found in North America.

References

External links

 

Mayflies
Articles created by Qbugbot
Insects described in 1931
Insects of North America